Donald Charles Quartermain (2 July 1908 – 23 October 1985) was an  Australian rules footballer who played with Fitzroy in the Victorian Football League (VFL). 

He was the older brother of Hawthorn player Allan Quartermain and his grandson, Joel Quartermain, is the guitarist in the band Eskimo Joe.

Quartermain later served in the Australian Army during World War II.

Notes

External links 
		

1908 births
1985 deaths
Australian rules footballers from Victoria (Australia)
Fitzroy Football Club players
Kew Football Club players